Ivan de Jesus Carbajal Balbuena (born ) is a Mexican male  track cyclist. He competed in the points race event at the 2014 UCI Track Cycling World Championships.

References

External links
 Profile at cyclingarchives.com

1990 births
Living people
Mexican track cyclists
Mexican male cyclists
Sportspeople from Oaxaca
Cyclists at the 2019 Pan American Games
Pan American Games competitors for Mexico
21st-century Mexican people